Waqar Ahmed (born 1 January 2000) is a Pakistani first-class cricketer who has played for the Khyber Pakhtunkhwa cricket team.

References

External links
 

1980 births
Living people
Pakistani cricketers
Peshawar cricketers
Pakistan Telecommunication Company Limited cricketers
Cricketers from Peshawar